Shamil Shamsudinovich Aliev (born September 9, 1979, in Makhachkala, Russian SFSR) is a retired amateur Tajik freestyle wrestler, who competed in the men's light heavyweight category. Representing his naturalized nation Tajikistan, Aliev won a bronze medal in the 84-kg division at the 2002 Asian Games in Busan, South Korea, scored a silver at the 2003 Asian Wrestling Championships in New Delhi, India, and then finished eighth at the 2004 Summer Olympics. Aliev is also a member of the wrestling team for Trade Union Sports Club in Makhachkala, before competing for the Tajik squad in 2002.

Aliev reached sporting headlines at the 2002 Asian Games in Busan, South Korea, where he picked up a bronze medal over neighboring Uzbekistan's Aslan Sanakoev in the men's light heavyweight category (84 kg) with a 3–1 decision. A year later, he captured a silver at the 2003 Asian Wrestling Championships in Delhi, India, losing 2–3 to Iran's Pejman Dorostkar.

At the 2004 Summer Olympics in Athens, Aliev qualified for his naturalized Tajik squad in the men's 84 kg class. Earlier in the process, he placed second and guaranteed a spot on the Tajik wrestling team from the Olympic Qualification Tournament in Sofia, Bulgaria. Aliev started the four-man prelim pool with a pair of marvelous victories over four-time Olympic veteran Nicolae Ghiţă of Romania (3–4) and Senegal's Matar Sène (3–6), before being edged out by Russia's Sazhid Sazhidov in a more complacent 5–0 decision. Placing second in the pool and eighth overall, Aliev's performance was not enough to advance him to the quarterfinals.

References

External links

Profile – International Wrestling Database

1979 births
Living people
Tajikistani male sport wrestlers
Olympic wrestlers of Tajikistan
Wrestlers at the 2004 Summer Olympics
Wrestlers at the 2002 Asian Games
Asian Games medalists in wrestling
Sportspeople from Makhachkala
Tajikistani people of Dagestani descent
Russian male sport wrestlers
Asian Games bronze medalists for Tajikistan
Medalists at the 2002 Asian Games